Zale obsita is a species of moth in the family Erebidae. It was described by Achille Guenée in 1852 and is found in North America.

The MONA or Hodges number for Zale obsita is 8686.1.

References

 Lafontaine, J. Donald & Schmidt, B. Christian (2010). "Annotated check list of the Noctuoidea (Insecta, Lepidoptera) of North America north of Mexico". ZooKeys, vol. 40, 1-239.

Further reading

 Arnett, Ross H. (2000). American Insects: A Handbook of the Insects of America North of Mexico. CRC Press.

External links

 Butterflies and Moths of North America
 NCBI Taxonomy Browser, Zale obsita

Omopterini
Moths described in 1852